Uday Sabnis (born 7 June 1959) is an Indian actor and voice actor. He has worked in English, Hindi and Marathi languages. As a voice actor, most of his work is Indian but he has also dubbed for foreign films and series.

Filmography

Live action films
 2017 Kaccha Limbu
 2016 Banjo as Vajya's Father
 2016 Naam Hai Akira as Baapu Rao
 2016 Duniya Geli Tel Laavat
 2015 Bioscope
 2015 Timepass 2 as Prajakta's Uncle
 2014 Rege as Commissioner
 2014 Poshter Boyz
 2014 Timepass as Prajakta's Uncle
 2013 Duniyadari as Inspector Inamdar
 2013 Dhating Dhingana
 2012 Ferrari Ki Sawaari as  Inspector
 2012 Miss Lovely as  Cop at Police Station
 2012 Jana Gana Mana as  Gaidane Saheb
 2011 Sharyat as Sita's Father
 2011 Khel Mandala as  Dadu
 2011 Arjun
 2011 Masti Express 
 2011 Dhava Dhav
 2010 Ringa Ringa as Chief Minister Appasaheb Marathe
 2010 Bahiru Pehlwan Ki Jai Ho
 2009 Ek Daav Dhobi Pachhad as Sakha Patil
 2009 Jhing Chik Jhing  as Shiva
 2009 Be Dune Saade Chaar
 2008 Checkmate
 2006 Lage Raho Munna Bhai as  Gaitonde
 2006 Shan as  Madan Barve
 2005 Sarkar
 2005 Mumbai Xpress as Traffic Police
 2002 Annarth
 2002 Hathyar: Face to Face with Reality
 1994 Woh Chokri (TV Movie)

Animated films

Dubbing roles

Animated series

Live action films

Hollywood films

Indian films

All released without their Hindi dubbed soundtrack albums except Robot.

Animated films

See also
Dubbing
List of Indian dubbing artists

References

Male actors in Hindi cinema
21st-century Indian male actors
Male actors from Maharashtra
Indian male voice actors
People from Thane
Living people
Male actors in Marathi television
1959 births